"The Way It's Goin' Down" is the first and only single released from Shaquille O'Neal's fourth album, Respect. It was released on July 3, 1998, featured Peter Gunz and was produced by DJ Quik, becoming Shaq's second straight solo single to feature Peter Gunz and DJ Quik after "Strait Playin'". The single peaked at number 47 on the Hot R&B/Hip-Hop Songs. Shaq along with DJ Quik & Peter Gunz performed the song live on The Tonight Show with Jay Leno in 1998.

Single track listing

A-Side
"The Way It's Goin' Down" (LP Version)- 4:29
"The Way It's Goin' Down" (Radio Edit)- 3:54

B-Side
"The Way It's Goin' Down" (Instrumental)- 4:22
"The Way It's Goin' Down" (Acapella)- 4:29

References

1998 singles
Shaquille O'Neal songs
Song recordings produced by DJ Quik
Songs written by Shaquille O'Neal
1998 songs
Interscope Records singles